NashiCon is an annual three-day anime convention held traditionally during March/April at the DoubleTree by Hilton Hotel Columbia, South Carolina in Columbia, South Carolina. It was the first anime convention in South Carolina and Nashi stands for Nippon Anime Society of Heavenly Imagery.

Programming
The convention typically offers an anime viewing room, artists alley, cosplay ball, dance, human board game (OTAKU - Oversized Tangential All-Consuming Kaleidoscopic Universe), panels, table top gaming, and video gaming. The Carolina Manga Library evolved out of NashiCon 2013 and provided the convention's manga library in 2014.

History
The first convention held in 2008 attracted 200+ attendees. They relocated venues to the Columbia Metropolitan Convention Center in 2012. NashiCon became a three-day convention in 2015.

Event History

References

Other Related News Articles
 Travis Bland, David (March 21, 2018). "Family of Characters: The Anime Gathering Nashicon Has Built a Rich Community in Its First 10 Years" Free Times, Retrieved 24 May 2018.

External links 
NashiCon official website

Anime conventions in the United States
Recurring events established in 2008
2008 establishments in South Carolina
Annual events in South Carolina
Culture of Columbia, South Carolina
Tourist attractions in Columbia, South Carolina
Conventions in South Carolina